Atanasije II Gavrilović (Skopje, late 17th century – Peć, 1752) was Archbishop of Peć and Serbian Patriarch from 1747 to 1752.

He was first mentioned in 1741 as the Metropolitan of Skopje. At that time, the throne of Serbian Patriarchate of Peć was contested between the Serbs, who were seen as rebels by the Ottomans, and Phanariote Greeks, who were very much loyal to the authorities. In the last Austro-Turkish War (1737–1739), in which Serbs supported Vienna, a major migration northwards into Habsburg territory was led by Serbian Patriarch Arsenije IV. The Ottomans brought Joanikije III, a Greek, to the throne in Peć. During his days all connections with Serbs in the Habsburg Empire were cut. Thus, the election – an Ottoman approval – of a Serb as the head of the Serbian Patriarchate of Peć delighted all the Serbs.

Immediately after his election Atanasije II made a canonical visit to Sarajevo. In 1748 we find him in Niš. In 1749 he visited Rila monastery, at the time a part of his patriarchate.

That same year Atanasije II visited Montenegro and then continued to the Adriatic littoral to visit his flock. He was accompanied by metropolitan of Cetinje Sava Petrović. The worried Venetian authorities tried to prevent their movement by increasing the sanitary measures for all people coming from the Ottoman Empire, thus also to the patriarch and his entourage. Next year (1750) Atanasije was in Belgrade where he installed Vasilije Petrović as the new metropolitan of Cetinje.

Atanasije II worked hard to reestablish the broken connections with Serbs in the Habsburg Empire whose church was now organized under the Metropolitan of Karlovci. As one of tokens of this renewed collaboration copper plates from book printing were sent from Sremski Karlovci to Atanasije II.

Since the treasury of the Serbian Patriarchate of Peć was all but emptied during the irresponsible rule of his predecessor, in 1750 Atanasije II sent his exarch, abbot of Studenica Vasilije Petrović to collect donations in the regions of the Metropolitan of Karlovci. Same was done in 1751 in the diocese of Valjevo. Atanasije II died in 1752.

References

Sources

 
 
  
 
 
 
 Сава Вуковић, "Атанасије ІІ Гавриловић", Српски биографски речник, књ. 1, Нови Сад 2004, 294.

External links
 Official site of the Serbian Orthodox Church: Serbian Archbishops and Patriarchs

Atanasije II
Serbian Orthodox metropolitans of Skopje
18th-century Serbian people
Serbs from the Ottoman Empire
1752 deaths